Beth Israel Synagogue is the synagogue of the Aruban Jewish community, located in Oranjestad, Aruba. Beth Israel Synagogue is an independent congregation with a liberal style similar to Reform Judaism or Conservative Judaism.

Community 
The community consists mostly of Jewish immigrants that arrived in Aruba from different parts of the world, and made it their home.
After 1924, a large group of Eastern European Jews, mostly from Poland, settled here, together with Jews from the Netherlands and Sephardic families from Suriname, another Dutch colony at that time.
The community opened a Jewish center in 1942 – the Jewish Country Club – and four years later, with the arrival of some Holocaust survivors, the community was officially organized.

Today, there are about 75 members, plus 180 overseas members. Due to its small size, and the intimate, close knit nature of the community, one joint organization was formed, blending the Sephardic with the Ashkenazic traditions, respecting the common culture, and enjoying the differences.

Leadership 
As of March 2013 Beth Israel Synagogue engaged the services of Rabbi Daniel Kripper who was originally from Argentina.
After his ordination at the Latin American rabbinical seminary in Buenos Aires, Argentina, He spent 3 years in Jerusalem, where he took postgraduate courses at the Hebrew University of Jerusalem.
Rabbi Kripper served as a spiritual leader in different communities including The Ari, The New Israelite Congregation in Uruguay, Temple Adath Shalom in Pittsburgh, PA and Temple Beth Shalom in Palm Dessert, Ca.
He has published many articles and several books and siddurim to comfort the sick. Up to his relocation to Aruba, Rabbi Kripper was the academic coordinator of the Latin American Rabbinical Seminary. In 2003 he received an honorary doctor of divinity degree from the Jewish Theological Seminary of America.

References

External links 
 Official website
 Haruth Communication's page on Aruba

Ashkenazi Jewish culture in North America
Dutch-Jewish diaspora
Buildings and structures in Oranjestad, Aruba
Polish diaspora in North America
Polish-Jewish diaspora
Sephardi Jewish culture in the Caribbean
Surinamese diaspora
Synagogues in Aruba